Timothy Byron Rider (January 8, 1848 – December 2, 1917) was a merchant and political figure in Quebec, Canada. He represented Stanstead in the House of Commons of Canada from 1891 to 1896 as a Liberal member.

He was born in Fitch Bay, Canada East, the son of Ezra B. Rider who came to Lower Canada from New Hampshire. Rider operated a sawmill and grist mill. In 1871, he married Mary E. Shaw. He was a member of the town council for Stanstead, also serving as mayor for eight years; he was also postmaster at Fitch Bay. Rider defeated Charles Carroll Colby, who had represented to the riding for 24 years, to win the 1891 federal election, but was defeated when he ran for reelection in 1896.

Electoral record

References 
 
The Canadian parliamentary companion, 1891, AJ Gemmill

1848 births
1917 deaths
Members of the House of Commons of Canada from Quebec
Liberal Party of Canada MPs
Mayors of places in Quebec